Warsaw Uprising may refer to:

Warsaw Uprising (1794)
The opening stage of the November Uprising (1830)
Warsaw Uprising (1905)
Warsaw Ghetto Uprising (1943)
Warsaw Uprising (1944)
Cross of the Warsaw Uprising

See also
 Battle of Warsaw (disambiguation)
 Powstanie Warszawskie (album)